Brachyglene fracta is a moth of the family Notodontidae first described by James S. Miller in 2008. It is endemic to north-central Venezuela.

The length of the forewings is 15.5–16.5 mm for females. The ground color of the forewings is chocolate brown with a yellow-orange transverse band. The ground color of the hindwings is dark brown to chocolate brown. There is a large, comma-shaped, yellow-orange spot near the apex.

Etymology
The name fracta was chosen by Prout in 1918 and is apparently taken from the Latin fractus (meaning broken) and probably refers to the orange-yellow forewing cross band which is incomplete.

References

Moths described in 2008
Notodontidae of South America